Herman Ene-Purcell (born 19 December 1994, Samoa) also known as "The Herminator" is an Australian professional boxer.

The biggest win of Ene-Purcell's career was against Justin Whitehead in October 2016, where Ene-Purcell won the bout by UD. Five months later, Ene-Purcell took on boxing veteran Afa Tatupu. Tatupu is well known for his New Zealand title bout against Joseph Parker with Parker receiving a serious cut. Ene-Purcell won the bout against Tatupu by first round TKO. The biggest bout of Ene-Purcell's career so far was against Kyotaro Fujimoto in Japan in May 2017. This bout was for both the WBC – OPBF and vacant WBO Asia Pacific Heavyweight Titles. Ene-Purcell lost the bout by TKO in the 9th round where his corner threw in the towel.

Professional boxing record

Personal life
Ene-Purcell was born in Samoa but was raised in North Shore, Auckland, New Zealand. He attended Glenfield College during his high school years.

References

External links
 Official Facebook Page

1994 births
Living people
Heavyweight boxers
Samoan male boxers
Australian male boxers
Samoan emigrants to Australia
People from North Shore, New Zealand